The Savannah Shamrocks Rugby Club is a rugby union team from Savannah, Georgia and member of USA Rugby and Division III of the Carolinas Geographical Union.

History 
The Savannah Shamrocks Rugby Club was formed in 1978 in Savannah by Tom Nelson and Carl Shoemaker, who were looking for something “different;” now the team has up to 50 members, a senior men's and women's team, plays around the region, belongs to the Georgia Rugby Union and hosts the popular St. Patrick's Day Tournament. The team colors are kelly green and gold. The home fields for matches are Forsyth Park and Daffin Park.

Men's Team

2013-Present Men's Team 

2013 saw new leadership at captain and during this year the Shamrocks club finished 4–2 in the Georgia Rugby Union Division 3 competition and were eliminated in the GRU Play-In Game with a loss to Charleston.    Savannah would finish the 2013 season with a 4–3 record.

The 2013-14 competitive season would become one of the most successful campaigns in club history with the team opening up with a 4–0 run in the Black Rose Tournament, hosted by Georgia Southern University, and claiming the Championship.  Savannah would run through the GRU Division 3 league season with an 11-0 regular season record defeating opponents from Armstrong Atlantic University, Golden Isles, Hilton Head, Valdosta State University, North Atlanta Rugby Club, High Country, Athens and Atlanta Renegades.  The Shamrocks hosted the GRU Division 3 Championship and defeated the Athens Eagles.  Savannah's 2013–14 season would come to an end in the South Regionals with a loss to Gainesville, Florida, and a final record of 12–1.

The club's 2015 season surpassed even the heights that were attained during the 2013-14 campaign.  The Shamrocks completed their second consecutive undefeated GRU regular season with a 9–0 record defeating Atlanta Old White, Augusta, Gwinnett, Hilton Head, North Atlanta, Athens, G.R.I.T.S., High Country and Macon.  Along the way the club participated in St. Patrick's Day Tournament and took 2nd place in Division 2 and in doing so defeated the Atlanta Renegades, making it a clean sweep of all opponents located within the state of Georgia.  Savannah took a forfeit victory in the GRU Semi-Final matchup to set up the GRU Championship Game with the Athens Eagles for the second consecutive year.  Savannah defeated Athens 29–24 to complete their second consecutive undefeated GRU season and capture the second straight GRU title.  In the South Regionals, hosted in Augusta, Georgia, Savannah took on the #1 seed, Clinch River (VA), champions of the True South Region.  Savannah defeated their opponent 38–5 to move into the South Championship game and rematch with last year's spoilers, Gainesville (FL).  The Shamrocks had lost three consecutive matches to Gainesville, counting their South Semi-Final loss in 2014, but were able to avenge these losses when it mattered most by defeating the Hogs 27-5 and earn a spot in the National Elite 8 in Charlotte, NC.  Savannah's 2015 season would come to an end with a loss to Old Gaelic (PA) by a score of 24–33.  Savannah would also fall in the consolation match-up with Danbury (CT) by a score 27–38.  The weekend's results mean that the Savannah Shamrocks would finish the 2015 season with a 13–2 record and tied for 7th place in the United States in Division III.

In 2016 the Savannah Shamrocks entered the GRU season as heavy favorites and high expectations for the year based on their past two competitive seasons.  The Shamrocks would complete an unprecedented third straight undefeated GRU regular season with a 9–0 record defeating Atlanta Old White, Augusta, Columbus, Hilton Head, North Atlanta, Athens, High Country, Gwinnett and Macon by an average margin of 64–5.  Savannah once again participated in the St. Patrick's Day Tournament in the middle of their competitive season; however, this time in the Premier Division, and defeated Chicago Blaze and losing in the semi-final to the USA Rugby South All-Star team by a score of 0–8.  Savannah squared off with the Augusta Maddogs in the GRU Championship game by a score of 62–7 to capture their third consecutive GRU title.  In the South Regionals, hosted in Montgomery, Alabama, the Shamrocks were able to come from behind at halftime to defeat the Montgomery Yellowhammers 33–21 to advance to their second straight South Championship game.  Savannah squared off with Southern Pines, the Carolina Champion, in the South Championship game and roared out to a huge lead and were able to hang on to that lead in the second half, winning by a score of 53-26 and advance to the National Elite 8 in Pittsburgh, PA.  Savannah's season would come to a premature end for the second straight year, this time to the hands of Bremer County (Iowa), dropping their contest 17–36.  However, Savannah would not let the defeat ruin their season, and in the consolation match-up with Rocky Gorge, the Shamrocks would take out their frustrations to the tune of a 77–0 win.  The win secured the Savannah Shamrocks a 5th-place finish in the United States in Division III, surpassing their 2015 finish and setting a new club's best finish nationally.

The 2017 season saw the Savannah Shamrocks enter a rebuilding year with player-coach Scott "Boston" Lucas having moved to Florida and player-coach Matthew Midgett taking over the coaching duties.  During the 2017 the Shamrocks would once again claim the top spot in the regular season standings by going 9–1 in the regular season with wins over Macon, Atlanta Old White, Augusta, Columbus, Athens, Gwinnett, North Atlanta, High Country, and the Atlanta Bucks while falling only once on the road to the Atlanta Renegades.  Savannah would play host to High Country in the semi-final matchup which they won 41–24.  Savannah faced the Atlanta Renegades in the GRU Championship game with a chance to avenge their only regular season loss, but would come up 3 points short.  Savannah would fail to claim their 4th consecutive GRU Championship by a score of 26–29.  With the 15s season closing out sooner than expected, the Savannah Shamrocks will now turn their attention to the 7s season as they continue to look forward to the upcoming 2018 season.

In 2018 the Savannah Shamrocks would finish their men's season going in 11–1 in Georgia Rugby Union (GRU) and for the 5th straight year appear in the GRU Championship game losing a heartbreaker in overtime to Augusta. The Savannah Shamrocks also went 3–0 in the St. Patrick's Day Tournament capturing the Division 2 Championship. Savannah went through the regular season without losing a match going 10–0. The semi-final was a rematch of one of their closest regular season contests with the Atlanta Renegades. Savannah was able to outlast the Renegades in overtime setting up a GRU Championship game with Augusta. Unfortunately, Savannah would fall in overtime of to Augusta in the championship match. Savannah has now appears in five straight GRU Championship matches, winning three of those contests. Savannah was able to bolster their roster with a lot of young talent and is hoping to retain many of this year's players as they look forward to regain the GRU Championship in 2019.

The 2019 season started off with Matthew Midgett moving from player-coach to the team's official head coach and promoting Liam Globensky to the team's captain. Several new players joined the club throughout the season and would help bolster the club's depth as they returned to form by going undefeated in the regular season (5-0) and defeating the Augusta Maddogs in a rematch of the 2018 GRU Championship game by a score of 54–12. During the club's regular season, Savannah also played in the Premier Division of the St. Patrick's Day Tournament and faced off with three Division 1 clubs and came out 2–1 with wins over Cincinnati and Columbus, while dropping a close match to Detroit, coming away with a 4th-place finish in the Tournament. For the first time in club history the Savannah Shamrocks hosted the South Regional Tournament for competition in Men's Division 2 & 3 as well as Women's Division 2 rugby. The Shamrocks were able to take advantage of that home field advantage by defeating the Palm Beach Panthers in the South Semi-Finals by a score of 17–3. The following day Savannah was able to defeat the Asheville Iguanas 26-10 claiming the South Championship and returning to the National Elite 8 for the third time in six years. The Shamrocks season would unfortunately come to an end against a tough Grand Rapids (MI) team by a score of 21–29. The consolation game would not go Savannah's way either as they faced off against the 2018 National Runner-Up, Long Island, and were defeated to close the season with a 9–2 record and a #7 finish in Division 3 of the United States. Of note during the season, Liam Globensky would break the club's single season scoring record by tallying 139 points.

The St. Patrick Day’s Tournament
St. Patrick's Day Rugby Tournament in Savannah is one of the largest in the country; every year the tournament has over 75 teams from Michigan, Maryland, Florida, Georgia, New York, New Jersey, Ohio, West Virginia as well as teams from Canada, England and Ireland. The St. Patrick's Day Tournament is held in Daffin Park, Savannah, Georgia.

The Savannah Shamrocks have given a portion of the proceeds from the annual event to local charities and individuals in the Savannah and rugby communities for the past 15 years and will continue to do so. They also host their own float in the annual St. Patrick's Day Parade, the nation's second largest St Patrick's Day celebration.

The tournament Grand Champions are : 
	1979 - University of Georgia
	1980 - Atlanta High Country
	1981 - Jacksonville
	1982 - Mystic River Club University of Maryland
	1983 - Xavier Old Boys
	1984 - Life College
	1985 - Augusta
	1986 - Cincinnati Marmots
	1987 - Pelicans (St. Petersburg)
	1988 - Augusta
	1989 - Old White (Atlanta)
	1990 - Life College
	1991 - Bergan
	1992 - Rock'n'Roll Rebels Ottawa, Canada
	1993 - Rock'n'Roll Rebels Ottawa, Canada
	1994 - Maryland Exiles
	1995 - New York Rugby Club
	1996 - BAT'S Boston Area Touring Side
	1997 - Northern Virginia
	1998 - Northern Virginia
	1999 - New York Athletic Club
	2000 - New York Athletic Club
	2001 - White Plains New York
	2002 - Unpossible XV
	2003 - Atlanta Renegades
	2004 - Cincinnati Wolfhounds
	2005 - Worcester RFC
	2006 - Air Force
	2007 - The Willing
	2008 - The Willing
	2009 - The Willing
       2010 - The Willing
       2011 - Cincinnati
       2012 - Air Force
       2013 - Cincinnati Wolfhounds
       2014 - USA Rugby South Panthers
       2015 - Cincinnati Wolfhounds
       2016 - Cleveland Crusaders
       2017 - Life University
       2018 - Life
       2019 - Life

Our Opponents 
Athens 
Atlanta Old White 
Atlanta Renegades 
Golden Isles 
High Country 
Hilton Head 
Jacksonville 
Macon

Sponsorship
Primary
 Murphy's Law
 Guinness 

Secondary
 The Black Ledge Group
 STATS Tours
 B&D Burgers

References

External links 
Official Site  
USA Rugby
Carolinas Geographic Rugby Union

Rugby union teams in Georgia (U.S. state)